Code Name: Heraclitus is a 1967 American thriller film starring Stanley Baker and Leslie Nielsen. The film originally was a television pilot that appeared as two episodes of Bob Hope Presents the Chrysler Theatre on January 18–25, 1967.

Plot
Stanley Baker stars as a British spy who investigates the past of Lydia Constantine (Signe Hasso), the widow of secret agent Constantine (Kurt Kasznar). Lydia is suspected of selling cold war secrets to the Communists. To ascertain the truth, it is necessary to "rebuild" agent Constantine and send his living counterpart behind the Iron Curtain.
When agent Constantine is "rebuilt" he doesn't remember anything.

Cast
Stanley Baker : Frank G. Wheatley
Leslie Nielsen : Fryer 
Jack Weston : Gerberman 
Sheree North : Sally 
Kurt Kasznar : Constantine 
Signe Hasso : Lydia Constantine 
Ricardo Montalbán (credited as Ricardo Montalban) : Janáček

See also
List of American films of 1967

References

External links
 
 

1967 television films
1967 films
1960s adventure thriller films
1960s spy thriller films
American adventure thriller films
American thriller television films
1960s English-language films
American spy thriller films
Films directed by James Goldstone
Television films as pilots
Television pilots not picked up as a series
1960s American films